Associazione Calcio Mestre is an Italian association football club located in Mestre, Venice, Veneto. It currently plays in Serie D, the fourth tier of the Italian league system. Its colors are orange and black.

History
The club was founded in 1927 as Unione Sportiva Mestrina.
The club made their first Serie C appearance in 1938, winning the league in 1946 and subsequently taking part to the 1946–47 Serie B season, on what it was the highest moment in the club's history.

In the following years, Mestrina played mostly around Serie C and Serie D level. In 1980 the club was renamed to Associazione Calcio Mestre, and played in the Serie C1 and Serie C2 leagues on a regular basis.

In 1987 the club was acquired by Maurizio Zamparini, who had already bought Venezia, in order to merge the two clubs together under a new denomination of Venezia-Mestre Calcio and a choice of team colours that combined Mestre's orange and black with Venezia's black and green. In 1989, following the club's change of name to Venezia 1907 (thus excluding any past reference to Mestre altogether) and the club's decision to move out of the Mestre-based Stadio Francesco Baracca in 1991, attempts were made to refound the original Mestre club, with Eccellenza club Malcontenta moving to the Venice suburb and changing its denomination to Malcontenta-Mestrina and finally back to Mestre Calcio.

In 1995, Mestre Calcio returned to Serie D, and won a second consecutive promotion the next year, thus bringing Mestre back to professionalism already in 1996. The club were relegated in 2003 and went bankrupt afterwards. The club resumed activity from Terza Categoria and reached Prima Categoria in 2010. A minor club in town, called Mestrina F.C., were playing in Eccellenza at the time; due to a number of legal loopholes, the two clubs merged in 2015 to acquire the footballing rights of Mogliano-based club Union Pro, who were playing in Serie D at the time. Through all this, Mestre managed to return to Serie D for the 2015–16 season, and won promotion to Serie C in 2017 under head coach Mauro Zironelli.

After the 2017–18 Serie C season, Mestre attempted to enroll in the next championship at the last minute. However, anticipated new financial backers walked away from the club, citing concerns over infrastructure. After the Serie C registration was rejected, Mestre had no better option but to play the 2018–19 season in Eccellenza.

Mestre were immediately promoted back to Serie D on their first Eccellenza season, winning the national playoff tournament in 2019.

Current squad

Out on loan

References

Un ruggito lungo un secolo, cento anni di calcio a Venezia e a Mestre, di Umberto Zane, Matteo Editore – Venezia 2008.

External links
Official homepage

Football clubs in Italy
Football clubs in Veneto
Sport in Venice
Association football clubs established in 1927
Phoenix clubs (association football)
Serie B clubs
Serie C clubs
Serie D clubs
1927 establishments in Italy
20th-century establishments in Venice